The sub-duchy of Schleswig-Holstein-Sonderburg-Norburg emerged as a collateral line of the House Schleswig-Holstein-Sonderburg. The region of Nordborg (also: Norburg or Nordburg) is on the island of Als.

Historic overview 
Around 1580 the younger brother of the Danish king, John acquired the island. When he died in 1622, the land was divided amongst his sons; like their father they were so-called Abgeteilte Herren whose status was not related to their dominion. Thus the northern part of Alsen initially went to John Adolf, whereupon he became the first Duke of Schleswig-Holstein-Sonderburg-Norburg. After his early death the region passed to his brother, Frederick. In the Second Northern War the land was devastated and the castle razed. In 1669 the state went bankrupt and the Danish king took it over. 

In 1679 the Norburg estate went to the line of Schleswig-Holstein-Sonderburg-Plön and was given as an inheritance to Augustus of Schleswig-Holstein-Plön-Norburg, the second son of the Duke of Plön, Joachim Ernest. Because the Plön line had no heirs at the beginning of the 18th century, the first son of Duke Augustus, Joachim Frederick, was named as the new Duke of both dominions - Plön and Norburg. After the death of Duke Joachim Frederick, Frederick Charles, the son of his deceased brother, Christian Charles,  - who came from a morganatic marriage - was named in 1722 as the new Duke of Plön and Norburg. He was not able to assume the Duchy of Plön until 1729 because of an inheritance dispute with the line of Schleswig-Holstein-Sonderburg-Plön-Rethwisch. Formally the last Duke of Norburg, he then abandoned the estate in favour of the Danish king, who took over all his debts in return. With that the Norburg line finally came to an end.

List of the Dukes of Schleswig-Holstein-Sonderburg-Norburg

References

Sources 
 zu einer volständigen Geschichte der Chur- und Fürstlichen Häuser (GoogleBooks)

External links
 Chronology of the Glücksborg dynasty

Sonderburg-Norburg